Danthonia decumbens (formerly Sieglingia decumbens) is a species of grass commonly known as the heath grass, heath-grass, or staggers grass It is a tussock grass native to Europe and adjacent parts of Asia and North Africa. It may also be native to Newfoundland and Nova Scotia.

Description
Danthonia decumbens is a perennial plant with a decumbent habit; it lies on the ground with the tips turned upward.

It has narrow, bright green leaves taper to a sharp point and are rather hairy. A long upper leaf sheath clasps the delicate stem.

The ligule consists of a ring of hairs, as in the purple moor grass, Molinia caerulea, except that in this plant each end has a tuft of longer hairs.

The panicle consists of 4 or 5 large erect glaucous silvery green or purplish awnless spikelets. These are arranged alternately on the upper part of the stem. The bunchgrass flowers in the summer months.

Ecology
The plant is found on acid pastures and heathland, on sandy or peat soils, which are also often damp.

The grass, having no domestic forage value, is not grown agriculturally.

References

Rose, Frances, 1974. Grasses, sedges and rushes, pages 20–21

External links

Danthonia decumbens in GrassBase, Royal Botanic Gardens, Kew

decumbens
Bunchgrasses of Africa
Bunchgrasses of Asia
Bunchgrasses of Europe
Flora of North Africa
Flora of the Caucasus
Flora of Macaronesia